The Hotham Handicap, raced as the Lexus Archer Stakes, is a Victoria Racing Club Group 3 Thoroughbred horse race for horses three years old and older, held under quality handicap conditions, over a distance of 2500 metres, held annually at Flemington Racecourse, Melbourne, Australia on Victoria Derby Day. Total prize money for the race is A$300,000.

History

Historically the race has been a traditional lead-up for the Melbourne Cup three days later, with the winner gaining exemption from any ballot for entry to the Cup.

As a "Quality Race", the weights are assigned as in a handicap, but with a maximum weight of 60 kg and a minimum weight of 52 kg.

The race is also famous due to a triple dead-heat in 1956 involving Fighting Force, Ark Royal and Pandie Sun.

Name
1869–1978 - Hotham Handicap
1979–1993 - The Dalgety
1994–1995 - Crown Quality
1996 - Ten News Stakes
1997 - Lean Cuisine Quality
1998–2008 - Saab Quality
2009–2018 - Lexus Stakes
2019 - Lexus Hotham Stakes
2022 - Lexus Archer Stakes

Distance
1869–1971 - 1 miles (~2400 metres)
1972 onwards -  2500 metres

Grade
1869–1978 -  Principal Race
1979–1980 -  Group 3
1981–2003 -  Group 2
2004 onwards - Group 3

Doubles wins
The following thoroughbreds have won the Hotham Handicap – Melbourne Cup in the same year.

Shocking (2009),  Brew (2000),  Think Big (1974), Baystone (1958),  Foxzami (1949), Sirius (1944), Dark Felt (1943), White Nose (1931), King Ingoda (1922) and Nimblefoot (1870).

1954 racebook

Winners

 2022 - Surefire
 2021 - Great House
 2020 - Ashrun
 2019 - Downdraft
 2018 - Prince Of Arran
 2017 - Cismontane
 2016 - Oceanographer
 2015 - Excess Knowledge
 2014 - Signoff
 2013 - Ruscello
 2012 - Kelinni
 2011 - Niwot
 2010 - Maluckyday
 2009 - Shocking
 2008 - Moatize
 2007 - Sculptor
 2006 - Maybe Better
 2005 - Strasbourg
 2004 - Don Raphael
 2003 - Big Pat
 2002 - Requiem
 2001 - Maythehorsebewithu
 2000 - Brew
 1999 - The Warrior
 1998 - Star Binder
 1997 - Backslapper
 1996 - Few Are Chosen
 1995 - Coachwood
 1994 - Pindi
 1993 - Tennessee Jack
 1992 - Big Barron
 1991 - Rasheek
 1990 - Mount Olympus
 1989 - Coshking
 1988 - Copatonic
 1987 - Scarvila
 1986 - Sea Legend
 1985 - Silver Award
 1984 - Chagemar
 1983 - Chagemar 
	1982	-	Allez Bijou
	1981	-	Mr. Cromwell
	1980	-	Bohemian Grove
	1979	-	Karu
	1978	-	Jury
	1977	-	Major Till
	1976	-	Reckless
	1975	-	Suleiman
	1974	-	Think Big
	1973	-	Daneson
	1972	-	Scotch And Dry
	1971	-	Not Again
	1970	-	Sudani
	1969	-	Tails
	1968	-	Raad
	1967	-	Midlander
	1966	-	Aveniam
	1965	-	Sail Away
	1964	-	Celero
	1963	-	River Seine
	1962	-	Le Storm
	1961	-	Oreka
	1960	-	Nilarco
	1959	-	Grand Garry
	1958	-	Baystone
	1957	-	Baron Boissier
	1956	-	† Fighting Force / Ark Royal / Pandie Sun 
	1955	-	Better Boy
	1954	-	Plato
	1953	-	My Hero
	1952	-	Morse Code
	1951	-	Glenvue
	1950	-	Thracian Lad
	1949	-	Foxzami
	1948	-	Howe
	1947	-	Dark Marne
	1946	-	Chaytor
	1945	-	Arduli
	1944	-	Sirius
	1943	-	Dark Felt
	1942	-	Dark Felt
	1941	-	Son Of Aurous
	1940	-	Dashing Cavalier
	1939	-	Catalogue
	1938	-	Spear Chief
	1937	-	Frill Prince
	1936	-	Balkan Prince
	1935	-	Sarcherie
	1934	-	Panto
	1933	-	Pretzel
	1932	-	Roc
	1931	-	White Nose
	1930	-	Cimbrian
	1929	-	Shadow King
	1928	-	Epilogue
	1927	-	† Eridanus / Bicolor
	1926	-	Beedos
	1925	-	King Of Mirth
	1924	-	Lilypond
	1923	-	Englefield
	1922	-	King Ingoda
	1921	-	Wirriway
	1920	-	Luteplayer
	1919	-	Sea Bound
	1918	-	Court Jester
	1917	-	Lingle
	1916	-	Dame Quickly
	1915	-	Hush Money
	1914	-	Uncle Matt
	1913	-	Gladwyn
	1912	-	Lord Alwyne
	1911	-	Prizefighter
	1910	-	Flavian
	1909	-	Footpad
	1908	-	Moani
	1907	-	Tulkeroo
	1906	-	Invergordon
	1905	-	Demas
	1904	-	Elvo
	1903	-	Martyr
	1902	-	Sojourner
	1901	-	Ohio
	1900	-	War God
	1899	-	Miss Carbine
	1898	-	Plutus
	1897	-	Metford
	1896	-	Mischief
	1895	-	The Trier
	1894	-	Foxtail
	1893	-	Straightfire
	1892	-	Hopetoun
	1891	-	Pigeontoe
	1890	-	Grey Gown
	1889	-	Meteor
	1888	-	Mara
	1887	-	The Levite
	1886	-	Claptrap
	1885	-	Lesbia
	1884	-	Favo
	1883	-	Wallangra
	1882	-	Odd Trick
	1881	-	Saunterer
	1880	-	Wellington
	1879	-	Trump Yoss
	1878	-	Levant
	1877	-	The Vagabond
	1876	-	Troy
	1875	-	Kinchrachrie
	1874	-	Newbold
	1873	-	Imperial
	1872	-	Early Morn
	1871	-	Saladin
	1870	-	Nimblefoot
	1869	-	Aurora

† Dead heat

See also
 List of Australian Group races
 Group races

References

Horse races in Australia
Open middle distance horse races
Flemington Racecourse